Kiva is a name. Notable people with the name include:

Given name
 Kiva Maidanik (1929–2006), Soviet historian and political scientist
 Kiva Reardon, Canadian film programmer, writer, editor, and commentator
 Kiva Simova, Canadian musician

Middle name
 Charles Kiva Krieger (1914–1972), interim mayor of Jersey City, New Jersey
 Lloyd Kiva New (1916–2002), Cherokee fashion designer

Surname
 Andriy Kiva (born 1989), Russian footballer
 Ilya Kiva (born 1977), Ukrainian politician
 Iya Kiva (born 1984), Ukrainian poet, translator, journalist, critic

Fictional characters
 Kiva, a human Lucian Alliance commander in the television series Stargate Universe
 Kiva, a character in the animated television series Megas XLR

See also
 Caoimhe, an Irish given name, anglicised Kiva
 Kiva (disambiguation)